The Portfolio Committee on Home Affairs is a portfolio committee of the National Assembly in the Parliament of South Africa. The remit of the committee includes oversight of the Department of Home Affairs, the Government Printing Works, and the Electoral Commission of South Africa.

Membership
Members elected in the general election that was held on 8 May 2019, were appointed on 27 June. Advocate Bongani Bongo of the African National Congress was elected chair of the committee on 2 July. The committee's members are as follows:

In 2021 Bongo was removed as chairperson and replaced with Steve Chabane.

The following people serve as alternate members:

See also
Committees of the Parliament of South Africa

References

External links
Portfolio Committee on Home Affairs at Parliament of South Africa

Committees of the National Assembly of South Africa